A parrot harness or bird flight harness is a type of pet harness that is specifically designed to be worn by a parrot.

Purpose and use
A parrot harness may enable a companion parrot to be taken outdoors while restraining it and preventing it from flying away. Some parrots may dislike wearing a harness and bite at it, but parrots that are harness-trained from a very young age may accept them willingly; more often, though, parrots must be very carefully and gradually accustomed and trained to wear a harness. Care must be taken that the parrot does not feel threatened. Properly trained parrots often appear to enjoy wearing their harnesses if they associate them with going outdoors.

If the harness is attached to a long leash, the parrot can be given some limited flight outside. However, this can be potentially dangerous for the parrot, which may be initially frightened by unfamiliar events, noises, and objects. It is usually best to first take the parrot out in a cage or carrier to let it become accustomed to being outdoors.  Parrot harnesses are available commercially in a range of brands and sizes, fitting small birds such as budgerigars and cockatiels, all the way up to the largest macaws and cockatoos. Some parrot owners may choose to make their own harnesses.

Heavy harnesses that require assembly with metal buckles and clips can be uncomfortable. They may be broken or unlatched by some larger birds with strong beaks.  A leash should always be fastened securely to the person holding the leash (such as by an elastic band around the wrist) to avoid the possibility of dropping the leash, as a dropped leash may become entangled in a tree or other object if a parrot flies off.  A harness should only be used when the parrot is supervised and should never be used to tether a parrot to a perch or other object.

Parrots can be trained to wear a harness using positive and negative reinforcement. Negative reinforcement is used to reward the parrot until it overcomes its fear of the harness. Food treats are used as positive reinforcement to reward the parrot for putting on the harness. A well trained parrot will put the harness on itself by slipping its head through the collar.

Gallery

See also
Parrot training

Notes and references

External links 
 Fundamental principles on using harness on parrots
 Video demonstration of fitting a parrot harness
 Tinkerbell - account of a flighted African Grey parrot in Taiwan taken out in harness to fly in the mountains and forests
 Tinkerbell UltraLite harness -How to make one sized to your bird
 Feathers, Flight and Parrot Keeping
 Article and video about taking parrots to a park wearing flight harnesses

Aviculture
Bird health
Pet equipment